This is a list of Members of Parliament (MPs) who held seats at the end of the 34th Canadian Parliament who did not stand for re-election in the 1993 federal election. In total, 73 MPs stood down.

List

References

See also 

1993 Canadian federal election
Lists of Canadian politicians